North Carolina's 5th congressional district covers the central western portion of North Carolina from the Appalachian Mountains to the Metrolina western suburbs. the district borders Tennessee, Virginia and South Carolina While the bulk of its territory is in the mountains it stretches south into the Piedmont where its largest city, Gastonia, can be found. The district is overwhelmingly Republican. Large portions were controlled by Republicans even during the “Solid South” era as much of northwestern North Carolina was Quaker or mountaineer and therefore resisted secession. Two counties in the district – Avery and Yadkin – have never voted for a Democratic presidential candidate since their creation, and Wilkes County has never done so since before the Second Party System. For the 2020 election the district has been updated per House Bill 1029 enacted by the NC General Assembly on November 15, 2019, becoming Session Law 2019–249. District boundaries are based on 2010 census tabulation blocks.

On February 23, 2022, the North Carolina Supreme Court approved a new map which changed the 5th district boundaries to include Alleghany, Ashe, Avery, Davie, Mitchell, Stokes, Surry, Watauga, Wilkes County and Yadkin Counties, most of Caldwell and part of Forsyth.

The fifth district is currently represented by Virginia Foxx, a Republican.

Counties 
Counties in the 2023-2025 district map.
 Ashe County
 Alleghany County
 Avery County
 Caldwell County (part)
 Davie County
 Forsyth County (part)
 Mitchell County
 Stokes County
 Surry County
 Watauga County
 Wilkes County
 Yadkin County

List of members representing the district

Recent election results

2004

2006

2008

2010

2012

2014

2016

2018

2020

2022

See also 

North Carolina's congressional districts
List of United States congressional districts

References

 Congressional Biographical Directory of the United States 1774–present

05
Western North Carolina